Fall from Grace is the fifth studio album by the Danish dance duo Infernal. It was released in Denmark on 27 September 2010. It was preceded by the lead single "Love Is All..." on 10 May 2010. "Love Is All..." peaked at number six on the Danish Singles Chart. The second single, "Alone, Together", was released on 13 September 2010.

The album debuted at number nine on the Danish Albums Chart on 8 October 2010, selling 1,850 copies in its two first weeks on the chart. It has since been certified gold by the International Federation of the Phonographic Industry (IFPI) for shipments of 10,000 copies in Denmark.

Track listing
All songs produced by Paw Lagermann and Lina Rafn, with additional production on "Club Erotic" by Simon Borch and Anders Heiberg.

Charts and certifications

Charts

Certifications

References

External links
Fall from Grace on Infernal's official website

2010 albums
Infernal (Danish band) albums